The office of Majority Leader of the Illinois House of Representatives, usually in practice called the Illinois House Majority Leader, is a statutory office of the Illinois House of Representatives.

Duties of office
The Illinois House Majority Leader is selected by the Speaker of the Illinois House of Representatives and is a member of the majority party of that legislative chamber. In practice, the House Majority Leader serves as the Speaker's chief floor aide and legislative whip. The House Majority Leader may preside over meetings of the Speaker's political party caucus or leadership team, and may serve as a negotiator for members of his or her political party in talks with other Illinois political leaders.

The Illinois House Majority Leader receives a stipend in addition to his or her pay as a member of the Illinois legislature.

List

Recent 
The current Illinois House Majority Leader, Representative Robyn Gabel, began her term in the position in 2023. She succeed Greg Harris who did not seek re-election.

See also 

 Illinois General Assembly
 Illinois House of Representatives
 Illinois Senate
 Politics of Illinois

References

External links 

 102nd General Assembly - Officers. Illinois House of Representatives.
 "Illinois House Leadership." The Voter's Self Defense System.

House
I